At My Age is an album by Nick Lowe released in June 2007 by Proper Records.  It was recorded in London and produced by Nick Lowe and Neil Brockbank.

Track listing
All tracks composed by Nick Lowe except where noted.
"A Better Man" – 2:16
"Long Limbed Girl" – 2:52
"I Trained Her to Love Me" (Lowe, Robert Treherne) – 2:59
"The Club" – 2:36
"Hope for Us All" – 3:42
"People Change" – 2:55
"The Man in Love" (Charlie Feathers, Quinton Claunch, William Cantrell) – 2:08
"Love's Got a Lot to Answer For" – 3:02
"Rome Wasn't Built in a Day" – 2:42
"Not Too Long Ago" (Joe Stampley, Merle Kilgore) – 2:20
"The Other Side of the Coin" – 2:47
"Feel Again" (Faron Young) – 2:48

Personnel

Musicians
Nick Lowe – lead vocals, rhythm guitar, electric bass
Robert Treherne – drums, backing vocals
Geraint Watkins – organ, piano
Steve Donnelly – lead guitar
Matt Radford – double bass
Matt Holland – trumpet, flugelhorn, piano solo on "People Change"
Martin Winning – tenor saxophone, clarinet
Bill Kirchen – 6-string bass on "The Club"
Chris Barber – trombone on "The Other Side Of The Coin"
Chrissie Hynde – backing vocals on "People Change"
Neil Brockbank – Vox organ on "The Club" and "People Change"
Bob Loveday – violin and viola on "People Change", "Rome" and "Feel Again"
Linnea Svensson – backing vocals on "Hope For Us All"
Anna Harvey – backing vocals on "Feel Again"
Nick Payne – baritone saxophone on "Rome" and "Not Too Long Ago"

Production
Produced by Nick Lowe, Neil Brockbank
Recorded at Goldtop Studio, Chalk Farm, London and RAK Studio, St John's Wood, London
Phil Hankinson - cover illustration

Charts
Sweden-10

References

External links
 

2007 albums
Nick Lowe albums
Albums produced by Nick Lowe
Proper Records albums
Yep Roc Records albums